g factor may refer to:

 g factor (psychometrics), a model used to describe the commonality between cognitive ability test results
 g-factor (physics), a quantity related to the magnetic moment of an electron, nucleus, or other particle
 The g Factor: The Science of Mental Ability, a book by Arthur R. Jensen about the psychometric concept
 The g Factor: General Intelligence and Its Implications, a book by Chris Brand about the psychometric concept

See also
g-force